Bija may refer to :
 Bija, India, a village in Punjab, India
 Bija State, a former princely state with seat in the above town
 Bīja, a concept in Hinduism and Buddhism
 Bija (album), a music album from 2000